Fast Food is an action game for the Atari 2600 written by Don Ruffcorn and published by Telesys in 1982.

Gameplay

The player controls a pair of disembodied lips, similar to a Chattery Teeth toy, named Mighty Mouth. Various fast food menu items fly across the screen and the mouth earns points by catching them. The player must avoid eating the purple pickles. After eating 6 purple pickles, the screen is replaced by large text reading "BURP!", followed by "CLOSED". As the player acquires more points, the speed of the game increases. The transitions between speeds are indicated by the text "YOU'RE GETTING FATTER".

Reception
Fast Food received a Certificate of Merit in the category of "Most Humorous Home Arcade Game" at the 4th annual Arkie Awards.

References

External links
Fast Food at Atari Mania

1982 video games
Action video games
Atari 2600 games
Atari 2600-only games
North America-exclusive video games
Video games about food and drink
Video games developed in the United States